Robert Khalaidjian (born 24 June 1958) is a former Armenian Soviet football player.

Honours
 1977 FIFA World Youth Championship winner with the Soviet Union.

References

External links
 

1958 births
Living people
Soviet footballers
FC Ararat Yerevan players
FC Armavir (Armenia) players
FC Lori players
Soviet Top League players
Association football forwards
Armenian footballers
Soviet Armenians